= Rhagiops =

Scientific classification
- Kingdom: Animalia
- Phylum: Arthropoda
- Class: Insecta
- Order: Coleoptera
- Suborder: Polyphaga
- Infraorder: Cucujiformia
- Family: Cerambycidae
- Genus: Rhagiops
- Species: R. costulipennis

Binomial name
- Rhagiops costulipennis Fairmaire, 1898

Genus of beetles

Rhagiops costulipennis is a species of beetle in the family Cerambycidae, and the only species in the genus Rhagiops. It was described by Fairmaire in 1898.
